Tomur Barnes (born September 8, 1970) is a former American football cornerback in the National Football League for the Houston/Tennessee Oilers, Minnesota Vikings, and the Washington Redskins.  He played college football at the University of North Texas.

1970 births
Living people
Players of American football from Texas
Sportspeople from Harris County, Texas
American football cornerbacks
Washington Redskins players
Houston Oilers players
Minnesota Vikings players
Tennessee Oilers players
North Texas Mean Green football players

University of North Texas alumni